Myrtle is part of the English common name of many trees and other plants, particularly those of the myrtle family (Myrtaceae).

Plants called "myrtle" include:

Myrtaceae 
Myrtaceae, the myrtle family 
Myrtus, myrtle, genus native to Europe and north Africa
Myrtus communis, common, European, or true myrtle, cultivated worldwide
Myrtus nivellei, Saharan myrtle
Luma apiculata, Chilean myrtle
Ugni molinae, Strawberry myrtle, native to Chile

Non-Australian natives, not in Myrtaceae 
 Family Cyrillaceae
Cyrilla racemiflora, myrtle
 Family Lauraceae
Umbellularia californica, Oregon myrtle
 Family Myricaceae
Myrica, wax myrtle, bayberry
 Family Lythraceae
Lagerstroemia, crepe myrtle
 Family Apocynaceae
Vinca minor, creeping myrtle

Australian/Asian natives, many not in Myrtaceae 
 Family Ebenaceae
Diospyros pentamera, black myrtle
 Family Fabaceae
 Acacia myrtifolia, myrtle wattle
 Family Myrtaceae
Agonis flexuosa, willow myrtle
Archirhodomyrtus beckleri, rose myrtle
Backhousia angustifolia, curry myrtle
Backhousia citriodora, lemon myrtle, sweet verbena myrtle
Backhousia myrtifolia, cinnamon myrtle, grey myrtle
Choricarpia leptopetala, brown myrtle
Hypocalymma angustifolium, white myrtle
Leptospermum scoparium, manuka myrtle
Melaleuca armillaris, bracelet honey myrtle
Melaleuca radula, graceful honey myrtle
Syzygium anisatum, aniseed myrtle
 Family Nothofagaceae
Nothofagus cunninghamii, myrtle beech
 Family Pittosporaceae
Auranticarpa rhombifolia, white myrtle
 Family Proteaceae
Hakea myrtoides, myrtle hakea
 Family Scrophulariaceae
Myoporum parvifolium, dwarf native myrtle

Notes

Set index articles on plant common names